Rear Admiral Rolf Hauter is a retired South African Navy officer who served as Chief Director Strategy and Planning.

Military career

He joined the Navy in 1970 and in 1974 earned a BMil degree at the South African Military Academy. He completed the Naval Senior Command Staff course in 1984. OC SAS Windhoek from 1987 to 1988 spending 273 days at sea. SSO Productivity Improvement at Navy HQ with promotion to Naval captain in 1989. Naval Attaché to Argentina during 1990 to 1992. He commanded the South African Naval College from 1993 to 1996. He was promoted to Commodore on 1 January 1998. Director Planning at the Policy & Planning Division. Chief Director Military Policy and  Strategy at Corporate Staff Division on 1 January 2000 with promotion to rear admiral, in 2005 he was transferred to Navy HQ as Chief Director Maritime Strategy, a post he occupied until 2009 when he retired from the SANDF.

He retired in 2007.

Awards and decorations

References

South African admirals
Living people
Military attachés
1951 births